Holoterpna errata is a moth of the family Geometridae first described by Louis Beethoven Prout in 1922. It is found in Namibia, Zimbabwe and South Africa.

Subspecies
Holoterpna errata errata
Holoterpna errata segnis Prout, 1930

References

Moths described in 1922
Pseudoterpnini